The 1990–91 St. Louis Blues season was one in which Brett Hull scored 50 goals in 50 games. Hull finished with 86, the third-highest total in National Hockey League history. After finishing the regular season with the NHL's second highest point total (105), the Blues overcame a 3-games-to-1 series deficit against the Detroit Red Wings in the Norris Division semi-finals before losing to the Minnesota North Stars in the Norris Division Final.

Offseason
Newly acquired defenceman Scott Stevens is named team captain, replacing Rick Meagher.

NHL Draft
St. Louis's draft picks at the 1990 NHL Entry Draft held at the BC Place in Vancouver, British Columbia.

Regular season

The Blues allowed the most short-handed goals in the NHL, with 18.

Final standings

Schedule and results

Player statistics

Regular season
Scoring

Goaltending

Playoffs
Scoring

Goaltending

Playoffs

Norris Division Semi-Finals

Norris Division Finals

Awards and Records
 Hart Memorial Trophy: Brett Hull
 Jack Adams Award: Brian Sutter
 Lester B. Pearson Award: Brett Hull
 Brett Hull, NHL Leader in Goals Scored (86)
 Brett Hull, Record of Most Goals by a Right Wing in One Season (86)
 Brett Hull, Right Wing, NHL First All-Star Team
 Adam Oates, Center, NHL Second All-Star Team

References
 Blues on Hockey Database

1990–91 NHL season by team
1990–91 in American ice hockey by team
1990-91
St
St